My Last Tango (Spanish: Mi último tango) is a 1960 Spanish drama film directed by Luis César Amadori and starring Sara Montiel, Maurice Ronet and Isabel Garcés. A former maid enjoys success as a tango performer in Argentina.

Cast
 Sara Montiel as Marta Andreu  
 Maurice Ronet as Dario Ledesma  
 Isabel Garcés as Clarisa  
 Laura Granados as Luisa Marival  
 Milo Quesada as Carlos Gardel  
 Luisa de Córdoba as Adelina  
 Alfonso Godá 
 Rafael Bardem as Maestro Andreu  
 Juan Cortés as Dr, Eladio Ferrer  
 María del Puy as Patricia  
 Mario Morales as Card Player  
 José María Labernié
 Diego Hurtado 
 Manuel Guitián as Stage Manager  
 Josefina Serratosa as Too Potent Singer  
 Rufino Inglés 
 Teófilo Palou as Well Travelled Man 
 Anotonio Vela as Boy giving bird cage to blind Sarita 
 Agustín González as Manager of Teatro Esmeralda

See also
 Caminito de Gloria (1939)

References

Bibliography 
 Bentley, Bernard. A Companion to Spanish Cinema. Boydell & Brewer, 2008.

External links 
 

1960 drama films
Spanish drama films
1960 films
1960s Spanish-language films
Films directed by Luis César Amadori
Films set in Buenos Aires
Remakes of Argentine films
Spanish remakes of foreign films
1960s Spanish films